Sekolah Tun Fatimah (abbreviated STF) is a premier all-girl boarding school (Sekolah Berasrama Penuh) located in Johor Bahru, Johor, Malaysia. The students in the school are affectionally known as STFians. In 2010, the school was awarded with the Sekolah Berprestasi Tinggi or High Performance School. The school specialises in hockey, band as well as basketball and dance (srikandi tari tun fatimah)
 STF has been known for producing high-resistant yet poised young ladies throughout Malaysia. The school is a member of the Strategic Educational Alliance of Southeast Asia.

History
Sekolah Tun Fatimah is an all-girls boarding school, also known as Sekolah Berasrama Penuh [SBP], which is administered by the Ministry of Education. Students are selected based on their excellent academic performances via the UPSR (Primary School Assessment Test) and PMR (Lower Secondary Assessment).

Sekolah Tun Fatimah was founded in Durian Daun, Malacca in 1956 going by the name Malay Girls Secondary School . The goal was to educate malay girls from rural areas.  Those who aspire to become teachers were enrolled directly into the Malacca Malay Women Teachers Training College (MWTC) after their LCE/SRP examination.

The school was officially launched by YB Encik Khir bin Johari, the Minister of Education of Malaya in 1958 and given the name "Tun Fatimah School, named after a famous Malay Srikandi Woman of the Malacca sultanate. Sekolah Tun Fatimah has moved to its current premises in August 1962. On 25 September 1965, STF was officially opened by HRH Sultanah of Johor, Sultanah Ungku Tun Aminah Binti Ungku Ahmad.

Rivalries

STF have a long held rivalry with two other all-girls premier boarding schools, Kolej Tunku Kurshiah and Sekolah Seri Puteri.

Students' Life
The uniform bodies that are present in the school is Marching Band and Wind Orchestra (STF Band), Malaysian Red Crescent Society (PBSM), National Police Cadet (Malaysia), Malaysian Fire Brigade Cadet, Persatuan Puteri Islam (PPI), Kadet Remaja Sekolah Malaysia(KRS), Persatuan Pandu Puteri Malaysia - Renjer (upper form) and Remaja (lower form).

There are three niche areas in STF. They are hockey, basketball, and band.
The school band is named "STF BAND", while the hockey team is "STRIDERS" and the school basketball team is called "DYNAMITES".

Notable alumni
The alumni association of STF is known as Persatuan Bekas Pelajar Sekolah Tun Fatimah (Srikandi)
 Tunku Azizah Aminah Maimunah Iskandariah - wife of Abdullah of Pahang, Sultan of Pahang, daughter of Iskandar of Johor, sister to Ibrahim Ismail of Johor, Sultan of Johor
 Tengku Norsida binti Tengku Mahmud - Kelantan royalty
 Rina Harun - Minister of Women, Family and Community Development (Malaysia), Chairlady of Woman's wing of Malaysian United Indigenous Party
 Mas Ermieyati Samsudin - Deputy Minister in the Prime Minister's Department, Former Chairlady of the Woman's Youth (Puteri) of United Malays National Organisation (UMNO), Deputy Chairlady of Woman's wing of Malaysian United Indigenous Party
 Rohaiza Hashim - Pos Malaysia Bhd group corporate communications head
 Mek Yam Jusoh - former TIME dotCom Bhd senior vice-president
 Siti Aishah Abdullah Senior Principal Assistant Director, Planning and Development Division, Ministry of Health (Malaysia)
 Sharifah Zaida Nurlisha Syed Ibrahim Jamalullail - General Manager of Project Management Services in MMC Oil and Gas Engineering Sdn Bhd.
 Dalina Ismail - author of "How to Think Like Mahathir"
 Najwa Hisham, senior vice-president, finance and revenue management, Keretapi Tanah Melayu Berhad
 Muhaya Mohamad - first ophthalmologist in South East Asia to perform bladeless femtosecond LASIK using the Visumax system, author of "How to be a good and successful medical Student” and “Celik Mata dan Jiwa"., inspirational speaker.
 Mariana Ahamad - Medical Veterinary Acarology
 Mumtazah Mustajab - Director ArchiSphere Sdn Bhd & Mumtazah Architect, Architect and Designer of Genius Kurnia (prev known as Permata Kurnia) and University of Nottingham Malaysia Campus
 Wardah Zainal Abidin - Associate Professor, head of Informatics Department Universiti Teknologi Malaysia
 Mai Shihah Abdullah - Associate Professor, Universiti Pendidikan Sultan Idris
 Intan Baizura Shuib - international bakery entrepreneur, owner of Intan's Oven brand
 Wan Mashitah Wan Abdullah Sani, managing director and chief executive officer, Malaysia Marine and Heavy Engineering
 LAr. Wan Salamatul Juita Dato' Dr. Wan Hashim, Landscape Architect. ILAM's award winner for Malaysia Landscape Architects Awards Young Landscape Architects of the Year for 2015. https://www.ilamalaysia.org/youngla . Her project for "Suria Residence” has won the category of “5 stars Best Residential Landscape Architecture” in the Asia Pacific at the international Property Awards of London and also has been listed by Star Property as the “Top 7 Earth Conscious Development Projects” in Malaysia.

References

External links
 

1965 establishments in Malaysia
Buildings and structures in Johor Bahru
Educational institutions established in 1965
Schools in Johor
Girls' schools in Malaysia